The athletics competition at the 2003 Pan American Games was held in Santo Domingo, Dominican Republic, from Tuesday, August 5, to Saturday, August 9, 2003. The competition comprised track and field events plus marathon races and three racewalking events, with a total of 46 contests taking place.

Men's results

Track

Field

Women's results

Track

Field

Medal table

Participating nations

 (3)
 (10)
 (20)
 (7)
 (6)
 (4)
 (5)
 (34)
 (1)
 (21)
 (5)
 (14)
 (22)
 (55)
 (4)
 (41)
 (12)
 (8)
 (11)
 (2)
 (8)
 (1)
 (34)
 (32)
 (4)
 (3)
 (4)
 (5)
 (13)
 (5)
 (3)
 (5)
 (1)
 (1)
 (19)
 (90)
 (4)
 (3)
 (15)

References
Day reports
Clavelo Robinson, Javier (2003-08-06). Felix Sanchez closer to gold as two records fall in opening day of Pan American Games. IAAF. Retrieved on 2010-09-13.
Clavelo Robinson, Javier (2003-08-07). Felix Sanchez gives glory to Dominican Republic, as four more Pan Am Games records fall. IAAF. Retrieved on 2010-09-13.
Clavelo Robinson, Javier (2003-08-08). Guevara qualifies for 400m final and Menendez is beaten in Pan American Games. IAAF. Retrieved on 2010-09-13.
Clavelo Robinson, Javier (2003-08-09). Guevara, Fernandez, Foster and Arrendel: women steal the show in Pan American Games. IAAF. Retrieved on 2010-09-13.
Clavelo Robinson, Javier (2003-08-10). Jamaica wins three titles and US dominates, as the athletics ends at the Pan Am Games. IAAF. Retrieved on 2010-09-13.
Results
GBR Athletics
All Results at Athletics Canada (Internet Archive)
athlecac results
Specific

 
2003
Pan American Games
Athletics
2003 Pan American Games